Antipolistes is a genus of moths belonging to the family Tineidae.

Species
Antipolistes anthracella Forbes, 1933
Antipolistes latebrivora (Meyrick, 1935)

References

Tineidae
Taxa named by William Trowbridge Merrifield Forbes
Tineidae genera